is a color 1954 Japanese film directed by Keigo Kimura.

Cast

See also 
 Senhime

References

External links 
  http://www.raizofan.net/link4/movie1/sen.htm
 

1954 films
Daiei Film films
Films scored by Fumio Hayasaka
Japanese historical drama films
1950s historical drama films
1950s Japanese films